Finkelstein ( or) is a German and Yiddish surname originating from Old High German funko (spark) and stein (stone).
Fünkelstein meant pyrite (George J. Adler A Dictionary of the German and English Languages, 1848). The Yiddish version of pyrite, finkelstein, could have denoted bareketh, one of the 12 tribe stones of High Priest's breastplate (Exodus 28:

Notable people
Notable people with the surname include:

 Abraham Finkelstein alias Arthur Fields (1884–1953), American singer and songwriter
 Amy Finkelstein (born 1973), American professor of economics
 Anthony Finkelstein (born 1959), British software engineer
 Arthur J. Finkelstein (1945–2017), American political strategist
 Avram Finkelstein, American gay rights activist
 Ben-Ami Finkelstein (1910–1975), Swiss psychiatrist
 Bernie Finkelstein (born 1944), Canadian music executive and talent manager
 Claire Finkelstein, American professor at the University of Pennsylvania Law School
 Clive Finkelstein (born ), Australian computer scientist
 Daniel Finkelstein (born 1962), British journalist and politician
 David Finkelstein (1929–2016), professor of Physics at the Georgia Institute of Technology
 Eric Finkelstein (born 1970), American health economist
 Hans Finkelstein (1885–1938), German chemist
 Heinrich Finkelstein (1865–1942), German pediatrician
 Israel Finkelstein (born 1949), Israeli archaeologist
 Jacob Finkelstein alias Jackie Fields (1908–1987), American boxer
Jerry Finkelstein (1916-2012), American publisher, businessman and political insider/power broker
 Louis Finkelstein (1895–1991), American Talmud scholar
 Louis Finkelstein (artist) (1923–2000), American painter and Queens College (CUNY) professor
 Max Finkelstein (1884–1940), New York City policeman
 Meir Finkelstein, Israeli-American cantor and composer of Jewish liturgical music
 Mel Finkelstein, American photojournalist
 Menachem Finkelstein (born 1951), Israeli district judge, Israel's Military Advocate General from 2000 to 2004
 Mendel Finkelstein (c.1878–1949), Australian cinema entrepreneur, founder of the  Greater Wondergraph Company in Adelaide
 Nat Finkelstein (1933–2009), American photographer and photojournalist
 Norman Finkelstein (born 1953), American political scientist and writer
 Norman Finkelstein (poet) (born 1954), poet and writer
 Peter Max Finkelstein alias Peter Max (born 1937), American artist
 Raymond Finkelstein (born 1946), Australian lawyer and judge
 Salo Finkelstein (1896/7–unknown), Russian-American mental calculator
 Samuel Finkelstein (1895–1942), Polish painter
 Shimcha Finkelstein (1917–1987), Polish-Israeli table tennis player
 Sidney Finkelstein (1909-1974), American writer
 Tamara Finkelstein (born 1967), British civil servant
 Vic Finkelstein (1938–2011), South African-British disabled activist and writer
 William Zorach alias Finkelstein (1889–1966), Lithuanian-American sculptor, painter, printmaker and writer

See also 
 Finkel
 Eddington-Finkelstein coordinates
 Finkelstein reaction, named after Hans Finkelstein
 Finkelstein's test, a method to diagnose DeQuervain's syndrome
 Garfinkel
 Garfunkel

References 

Germanic-language surnames
German-language surnames
Jewish surnames
Yiddish-language surnames
Surnames from ornamental names
de:Finkelstein